"The Love of Richard Nixon" is a song by Welsh alternative rock band Manic Street Preachers. It was released on 18 October 2004 by Sony Music UK as the first single from their seventh studio album, Lifeblood (2004), and reached number two on the UK Singles Chart.

Content
The song is, according to the band, "a soundtrack to disillusion, hatred, love and never giving up". More specifically, the song is a sympathetic appraisal of former US president Richard Nixon and mentions some of his positive achievements, inevitably overshadowed by the Watergate Scandal. The timing of the single's release, two weeks before George W. Bush's victory at the 2004 US presidential elections, can also be seen as a statement by the band concerning the reputation of the USA's leadership at the time.
In an interview with Repeat Fanzine, the band also said it represents how they feel in comparison to Radiohead. Nicky in particular commented that they feel like Richard Nixon compared to Radiohead's John F. Kennedy: "'If Radiohead are Kennedy, then Manic Street Preachers are Nixon: the ugly duckling who had to try 10 times harder than anyone else. Paranoid megalomaniacs.'"

The sound is more electronic than most of their previous hits, indicative of a slight switch in sound on Lifeblood; according to the band the song contains no guitars.

Release and reception
"The Love of Richard Nixon" was released on 18 October 2004 by record label Sony Music UK as the first single from the band's seventh studio album, Lifebood. Unusually, the three formats of the single—two CDs and a DVD—could be bought together for £5 at most record stores, encouraging multiple purchases of the single. The song reached number two on the UK Singles Chart, number 15 on the Spanish Singles Chart, and number 17 on the Irish Singles Chart.

Track listings

UK CD1
 "The Love of Richard Nixon"
 "Everyone Knows/Nobody Cares"

UK CD2
 "The Love of Richard Nixon"
 "Everything Will Be"
 "Askew Road"
 "The Love of Richard Nixon"

UK DVD single
 "The Love of Richard Nixon"
 Quarantine (In My Place Of) (short film)
 "Voodoo Polaroids"

Credits and personnel
Credits are adapted from the UK CD1 liner notes.

 James Dean Bradfield – writing
 Nicky Wire – writing
 Sean Moore – writing
 Nick Nasmyth – keyboards
 Jeremy Shaw – additional keyboards
 Greg Haver – percussion, production

 Tom Elmhirst – additional production, mixing
 Steve Davis – additional engineering, Pro Tools
 Martin Hall – management
 Farrow Design – artwork design and direction
 John Ross – portrait

Charts

References

External links
 NME article on the song

2004 singles
2004 songs
Manic Street Preachers songs
Songs written by James Dean Bradfield
Songs written by Nicky Wire
Songs about Richard Nixon
Songs written by Sean Moore (musician)
Sony Music UK singles
Works about the Watergate scandal